

Notes
 Williams, Nick (March 25, 2016).  "Bedrockk Shares Sleek Dancehall Rework of Robin S.'s 'Show Me Love' Feat. Lyrique: Exclusive". Billboard (magazine)
 Nappy (April 25, 2014). "Exclusive: Bedrockk - "Bottle Sippin". Complex (magazine).
 Murray, Robin (June 11, 2015). "Premiere: Bedrockk - 'Just Like You'. Clash (magazine)
 Thump Staff Writer (July 15, 2015). "Notes From The Underground: The Most Vital Tracks and News From the Worldwide Underground". Thump (Vice)
 Bedrockk Feat Swoonz "Faded". Soundcloud, December 2013.
 McCaskill, Clark (January 27, 2015). “Submerse yourself in the bass soundscape of Bedrockk’s “Oceans Lifted” [Premiere]”. Earmilk
 Hirsch, Adam (November 5, 2013). "Bedrockk - Believe [RTT Premiere] + Bonus Tracks". Run The Trap
 Malan, Jamie (July 21, 2015).  “Bedrockk Shares New Track ‘Dream City’ ”.  AXS TV

1986 births
Living people
American electronic musicians
Record producers from California
DJs from San Francisco
Electronic dance music DJs
21st-century American male singers
21st-century American singers